Clarence Island is the easternmost island in the South Shetland Islands, off the coast of Antarctica. It is claimed by Argentina as part of Argentine Antarctica, by Britain as part of the British Antarctic Territory, and by Chile as part of the Chilean Antarctic Territory. The name dates back to at least 1820 and is now established in international usage, except for Russia, where it has been known as Shishkova Island since its discovery by Russians in 1821.

Ravelin Ridge and Urda Ridge occupy the interior of the mountainous island. The southeast slopes of the two ridges are drained by Dobrodan, Highton, Treskavets, Orcho, and Banari Glaciers, and their northwest slopes — by Skaplizo, Giridava, and Bersame Glaciers. There are two small islands just east of Clarence Island, the northern one is named Sugarloaf Island. Chinstrap Cove lies on the northwest coast of the island, while Istros Bay, Smith Cove, and Kutela Cove lie on its southeast side.

Antarctic explorer Ernest Shackleton's Imperial Trans-Antarctic Expedition observed and considered landing on Clarence Island after escaping the pack ice of the Weddell Sea but instead landed on nearby Elephant Island. The high point on Clarence Island was reached by members of the Joint Services Elephant Island Expedition in 1970, which also completed a survey of Elephant and Clarence Island.

Maps
Chart of South Shetland including Coronation Island, &c. from the exploration of the sloop Dove in the years 1821 and 1822 by George Powell Commander of the same. Scale ca. 1:200000. London: Laurie, 1822.
British Antarctic Territory. Scale 1:200000 topographic map. DOS 610 Series, Sheet W 61 54. Directorate of Overseas Surveys, Tolworth, UK, 1972.
South Shetland Islands: Elephant, Clarence and Gibbs Islands. Scale 1:220000 topographic map. UK Antarctic Place-names Committee, 2009.
Antarctic Digital Database (ADD). Scale 1:250000 topographic map of Antarctica. Scientific Committee on Antarctic Research (SCAR). Since 1993, regularly upgraded and updated.

See also
 Composite Antarctic Gazetteer
 List of Antarctic islands south of 60° S
 SCAR
 Territorial claims in Antarctica

Notes

References
 Clarence Island. SCAR Composite Gazetteer of Antarctica

External links
 Clarence Island. Adjusted Copernix satellite image

 
Islands of the South Shetland Islands